Twinke Borge (born 1971) is a Hawaiian activist who is involved with Hawaii's largest homeless encampment, Pu‘uhonua o Wai‘anae (or "the village" for short).

Life 
In her role as the leader of the village, she selects Captains of the community to keep order in the camp. Borge herself has lived in the camp for more than 15 years.

In order to avoid sweeps, or clearances, of the village, Borge has liaised with the state government who owns the land on which the homeless camp is located. Under her leadership, the village managed to purchase 20 acres of land in order to build more permanent housing.

References 

Native Hawaiian activists
Homeless people

1971 births
Living people